"Untouchable" is a song performed by British all-female pop group Girls Aloud, taken from their fifth studio album Out of Control (2008). The song was written by Miranda Cooper, Brian Higgins and his production team Xenomania, and produced by Higgins and Xenomania. Influenced by trance music and Balearic beat, the album version of "Untouchable" is almost seven minutes long. Remixed for single release in April 2009, "Untouchable" memorably became Girls Aloud's first of only two singles to miss the top ten on the UK Singles Chart, breaking a run of 20 top ten hits. The song received generally favorable reviews from most contemporary music critics, who praised its ambition. "Untouchable" would be the final release by the group before their hiatus.

In the accompanying music video, inspired by Stanley Kubrick's film 2001: Space Odyssey, the group members travel through space and approaches Earth in illuminated glass spheres, resembling meteorites. "Untouchable" was promoted through an appearance on Dancing on Ice, and was later performed on the group's Out of Control Tour (2009) and Ten: The Hits Tour (2013).

Background and composition 
"Untouchable" is a trance-inspired "rave ballad," which marries "Balearic guitar lines with a pulsating techno throb." The song is Girls Aloud's longest yet, at a full runtime of 6:45. "Untouchable" follows the common verse-chorus form, but includes a number of instrumental solos. Nadine Coyle sings a middle 8 ("Without any meaning, we're just skin and bone...") as the music drops out. The song builds back up and concludes with a final chorus.
 
The "emotional twangy guitar noise" heard in the song was the result of Xenomania musician Jason Resch responding to Higgins' request for something "special". Higgins left the song at its full length, knowing that "The Promise" and "The Loving Kind" would be the first two singles and he could remix "Untouchable" for single release at a later point. The song was "chopped and changed for its single release", with Girls Aloud's vocals being vocodered.

Release 
"Untouchable" was selected as the third single from Out of Control after it fared best in a fan poll on Girls Aloud's official forum. It was announced as the single on 20 February 2009. "Untouchable" was released on CD single and 7" vinyl formats on 27 April, while digital download formats were available a day earlier. The CD includes a previously unreleased b-side entitled "It's Your Dynamite", which Digital Spy says "matches the standard set on their previous releases [...] a treat for the ears." The 7" vinyl picture disc format includes the Thriller Jill Mix of "Love Is the Key", as heard on The Girls Aloud Party opening credits and commercials. A promo CD was released with various remixes previously unreleased or part of the singles collection.

Reception

Critical response

"Untouchable" received generally favourable reviews from music critics. Slant Magazine said that it was "one of Girls Aloud's finest achievements." Matthew Horton of The Quietus labelled the song as an "epic, a nearly-seven-minute monster". Similarly, John Murphy from MusicOMH called the track an "epic seven-minute electro-thumper which builds slowly, explodes into life, drops out brilliantly, then bursts back into life". In a blog for BBC, Fraser McAlpine agreed that "it's epic and dreamy and a bit of a diversion from the usual GA pattern while still being recognisably very Girls Aloud." It was also praised by NMEs Jaimie Hodgson, described as "post-Ibiza power-balladeering". The song was referred to as "fast, electronic and fantastic" with an immense build-up to the chorus by Peter Robinson from Popjustice. Talia Kraines of BBC Music felt "the Balearic bliss of epic seven minute marathon Untouchable [...] prove[s] that you don't have to be brassy to be brilliant."

Michael Cragg from The Guardian called it a proper "statement song", as well as "the band's most effortless-sounding single" without ever feeling overly long. Nick Levine of Digital Spy said the song "serves as the centrepiece" on the album and that even the radio edit "remains surprising, thrilling and strangely moving - in short, classic Girls Aloud." Matthew Chisling from AllMusic deemed it "the album's most club-friendly smash". Newsround declared it "seems to want to be a ballad and a dance track without doing either well." GayNZ.coms Andrew Grear stated that the song "works....but possibly not as well as the girls were hoping." Andy Gill from The Independent called it a "stomp-a-matic filler" from the album.

Chart performance
The song entered the UK Singles Chart on 29 March 2009 at number 54. It entered the top forty three weeks later. On 3 May 2009, it officially reached number eleven. On the Irish Singles Chart, the song entered at number 38 and peaked at number nineteen.

After the single failed to achieve top ten success when it was released late April 2009, a fan-created Facebook campaign was started nearly a year later (January 2010). The group hoped to push the single into the top ten, reviving and continuing Girls Aloud's streak. The campaign failed, with "Untouchable" only charting at number 152.

Music video 
The music video for "Untouchable" was directed by Marco Puig with post-production from The Mill. Shot in a west London studio on 18 March 2009, the filming took sixteen hours. The video premiered on 25 March 2009  on 4music at 7:00pm GMT and was shown again at 11:05pm on Channel 4. The "Untouchable" video was made available on MSN the following day.

The futuristic video was inspired by Stanley Kubrick's classic science fiction film 2001: A Space Odyssey. Girls Aloud appear in "sci-fi inspired PVC leotards", travelling through space and approaching Earth in illuminated glass spheres (resembling meteorites). After the second verse, the words 'Alert: Condition Red' appear on the screen and the girls have trouble in their bubble-like orbs. They begin to plummet through Earth's atmosphere, with the spheres erupting in flames. Still burning, they pass an aeroplane and approach a city. The video ends with televisions showing the 'breaking news' as they hit the ground, with a reporter describing it as a "meteor shower" before turning to static.

Digital Spy lauded the "Untouchable" music video as "almost as exciting as the song itself."

Live performances 
The first performance of the song occurred at the Dancing on Ice semi-finals. Girls Aloud entered on wires suspended from the ceiling and performed the song whilst ice dancers Torvill and Dean skated around them. Girls Aloud wore draped Grecian dresses. Smoke followed the group as they were lowered down on to individual podiums. As Nadine sang the final verse, Torvill and Dean were raised into the air on wires. The song ended with an explosion of pyrotechnics. Torvill and Dean were criticised for "completely and utterly ruining the momentum and energy."

"Untouchable" was one of the most significant performances of Girls Aloud's 2009 Out of Control Tour. The song is "performed over the crowd on a flying platform," which Girls Aloud used to travel to a smaller stage in the middle of the arena. The group wore science fiction-inspired outfits, designed by Welsh fashion designer Julien MacDonald, along with the rest of the show's costumes. According to Lauren Mulvenny from the Belfast Telegraph, the performance got "a great crowd reaction." The song was performed on 2013 Ten: The Hits Tour with the girls singing it on a stage in the middle of the arena.

Formats and track listings
These are the formats and track listings of major single releases of "Untouchable".

UK CD
 "Untouchable" (Radio Mix) – 3:49
 "It's Your Dynamite" (Girls Aloud, Xenomania) – 4:21

UK 7" picture disc
 "Untouchable" (Radio Mix) – 3:49
 "Love Is the Key" (Thriller Jill Mix) – 6:35

Digital download
 "Untouchable" (Radio Mix) – 3:49
 "Untouchable" (Bimbo Jones Radio Edit) – 3:46
 "Untouchable" (Bimbo Jones Club Mix) – 6:04

iTunes download
 "Untouchable" (Radio Mix) – 3:49
 "Untouchable" (Album Version Edit) – 3:03
 "Untouchable" (Bimbo Jones Club Mix) – 6:04

The Singles Boxset (CD21)
 "Untouchable" (Radio Mix) – 3:49
 "It's Your Dynamite" – 4:21
 "Love Is the Key" (Thriller Jill Mix) – 6:35
 "Untouchable" (Album Version Edit) – 3:03
 "Untouchable" (Bimbo Jones Club Mix) – 6:04
 "Untouchable" (Bimbo Jones Radio Edit) – 3:46
 "Untouchable" (Bimbo Jones Dub) – 6:02

Promo CD
 "Untouchable" (Almighty Essential Radio Edit) – 4:36
 "Untouchable" (Almighty Essential Mix) – 9:11
 "Untouchable" (Almighty Alternative Vocal Mix) – 9:11
 "Untouchable" (Almighty Essential Dub) – 9:13
 "Untouchable" (Almighty Essential Instrumental) – 9:11

Credits and personnel
Bass guitar: Kieran Jons
Engineering: Toby Scott, Dan Aslet
Guitars: Nick Coler, Jason Resch
Keyboards and programming: Tim Powell, Brian Higgins, Miranda Cooper, Owen Parker, Fred Falke, Sascha Collison, Matt Gray
Mixing: Tim Powell, Brian Higgins
Songwriting: Miranda Cooper, Brian Higgins, Tim Powell, Matt Gray
Published by Warner/Chappell Music and Xenomania Music

Charts

References

External links
Girls Aloud's official website

2000s ballads
2008 songs
2009 singles
Synth-pop ballads
Girls Aloud songs
Song recordings produced by Xenomania
Songs written by Brian Higgins (producer)
Songs written by Miranda Cooper
Songs written by Tim Powell (producer)
Fascination Records singles